is a series of puzzle arcade video games created by Arika.

Released in Japan in August 1998 Tetris: The Grand Master was followed by two sequels, Tetris: The Absolute – The Grand Master 2 in October 2000 (with a Plus version released December 2000) and Tetris: The Grand Master 3 – Terror‑Instinct in March 2005. A spin-off console game, Tetris: The Grand Master Ace was published by AQ Interactive on December 10, 2005 and was a launch title for the Xbox 360's Japan release. On December 1, 2022, Tetris: The Grand Master was released for the Nintendo Switch and PlayStation 4 as part of the Arcade Archives series.

Gameplay

The basic gameplay of Tetris: The Grand Master is similar to that of other Tetris games. The player must move and rotate tetromino-shaped pieces falling into a well to form horizontal lines, which will then be cleared. During gameplay, the game automatically gives ranks to the player according to their score, starting from 9 up to Grand Master (GM), roughly following the dan ranking system. The game speeds up rapidly, eventually reaching instant gravity, where blocks appear immediately at the bottom, and upwards of three tetrominoes per seconds.

Tetris: The Grand Masters gameplay is heavily inspired by Sega's Japanese arcade version of Tetris, released 10 years earlier. It uses a modified version of that game's rotation system, the same color scheme for tetrominoes, and relies heavily on mechanics such as lock delay, similar to Sega's game.

The main goal in Tetris: The Grand Master is to score points, awarding the player a higher grade. The game ends when a player reaches level 999. If the player scored enough points, they will be awarded with the grade S9. To achieve the grade GM, the player must also meet some time requirements during play. If the player tops out before reaching level 999, the game ends, awarding the player the current grade and its "mastering time", the time at which the grade was awarded during gameplay.

Games

Tetris: The Grand Master
The original game was released in Japanese arcades in August 1998.

On November 1, 2021, Arika president Ichiro Mihara posted on Twitter that a formal announcement for the upcoming release of a home port of the Tetris: The Grand Master series was being delayed, thus revealing that a home port for the series was currently in development. A year later, Arika announced on Twitter that Hamster Corporation licensed the first Tetris: The Grand Master game as part of their Arcade Archives series, to be released on December 1, 2022, for the Nintendo Switch and PlayStation 4.

Tetris: The Absolute – The Grand Master 2
Tetris: The Absolute – The Grand Master 2 was released in 2000, and added additional modes of play. One of these new modes is the Master mode, which extends the classic Tetris: The Grand Master gameplay with larger speed increases, more requirements to achieve the M or GM grades, and an additional challenge when the M rank is achieved where the player must survive the credits roll with the additional handicap of the tetrominoes turning invisible upon locking. Additional modes include a more casual Normal mode, a Versus mode enhanced with item battles, and a two-player co-op mode.

An update, Tetris: The Absolute – The Grand Master 2 Plus, added additional modes such as "TGM+", which adds rising garbage blocks to the game field, and "T.A. Death" where the game begins at 20G (maximum gravity where blocks appear at the bottom instantly) and every other aspect of the game also speeds up steadily.

Tetris: The Grand Master 3 – Terror‑Instinct
Tetris: The Grand Master 3 – Terror‑Instinct was released in 2005. The game now runs on PC-based hardware, specifically the Taito Type X. The level system has been expanded in many forms with increasingly stricter requirements to reach the Grand Master rank. Modes include Easy, Sakura (a puzzle mode also seen in Tetris With Cardcaptor Sakura: Eternal Heart), the traditional Master mode, and Shirase (an extension of T.A. Death with even harsher speed, garbage, and levels beyond 999). It also features World and Classic Rules, the former added by Arika due to The Tetris Company's then-recent policy changes.

Tetris: The Grand Master Ace
Released in 2005 as a Japan-only launch title for the Xbox 360, this was the only game in the series exclusive to home consoles.

Unreleased games

PlayStation port
Tetris: The Grand Master was to be ported to the PlayStation in 1999, but because of a licensing restriction the port was canceled.

TGM-K (tentative name)
In July 2004 Arika announced TGM-K for release on the PSP. The reason for the lack of development is that clones of the TGM series are widespread and cannot be licensed.

Tetris: The Grand Master 4 – The Masters of Round
In September 2009, Tetris: The Grand Master 4 – The Masters of Round was unveiled at the Amusement Machine Show. Tetris: The Grand Master 4 was supposed to run on the Sega RingWide hardware. On September 18, 2010, Arika Vice President Ichiro Mihara announced the cancellation of The Grand Master 4 on his blog. In July 2015, Arika began location testing The Grand Master 4 in Japan and the United States. The titled was changed to The Grand Master 2015 reflecting the lack of a Tetris license or planned release.

Notes

References

External links
Arika pages: TGM1, TGM2P, TGM3

1998 video games
2000 video games
2005 video games
Arcade video games
Arika games
Capcom games
Hamster Corporation games
Nintendo Switch games
PlayStation 4 games
PlayStation Network games
Puzzle video games by series
Tetris
Video game franchises introduced in 1998
Video games developed in Japan
Video games scored by Shinji Hosoe
Xbox 360 games